333 South Wabash (formerly CNA Center, nicknamed "Big Red") is a 600-ft (183 m), 44-story skyscraper located at 333 South Wabash Avenue in the central business district of Chicago, Illinois.

Description
333 South Wabash is a simple, rectangular International Style building, but it is unique in that the entire building was painted bright red by Eagle Painting & Maintenance Company, Inc., turning an otherwise ordinary-looking structure into one of the most eye-catching buildings in the city. It was designed by the firm of Graham, Anderson, Probst & White and was completed in 1972.

Occupants
As of 2014, CNA occupied 65 percent of the tower. Other occupants included The Chicago Housing Authority, United Way and Akuna Capital.

In December 2015, CNA announced it would sell the structure and relocate to a new facility at 151 North Franklin which would be renamed CNA Center.  The company and developer, John Buck Co., expected the move to take place in summer 2018.  As part of the transaction, Buck purchased the Wabash Street building for $108 million and would redevelop it.

In August 2017, Buck and Northern Trust announced an agreement for the bank to lease  of the building.  The lease, which includes signage and naming rights, will consolidate approximately 2,500 to 3,000 Northern Trust workers from several sites around Chicago and take place in 2020.

History
Originally known as Continental Center III, in reference to the original moniker of CNA Financial Corporation, Continental National American Group, both CNA Center (formerly CNA Plaza) and the neighboring CNA Center North (Continental Center II, built in 1962 at 55 East Jackson Blvd.) adjoined and were painted red. The shorter red building was later restored to its original gray tone in 1999. The two buildings remain joined at the second floor: CNA's Conference Center uses space on that floor, but all entrance and egress to it is through CNA Center. The company's previous headquarters from 1943 to 1962 had been Metropolitan Tower (310 South Michigan Avenue, aka Continental Center I).

In 1999, a large fragment of a window fell from the building and killed a woman walking with her child.  Windows had been cracking at the building ever since it had been built in 1975 due to thermal stress of uneven heating caused by the building’s inset windows. CNA Financial, a property insurance company, later paid $18 million to settle the resultant lawsuit. All of the building's windows were replaced in an expensive retrofit.

Lighted window messages

Utilizing a combination of lights on/off and 1,600 window blinds open/closed (and sometimes foamboard cutouts), the windows on 333 South Wabash are often used to display lighted window messages, typically denoting holidays, remembrances, and other events denoting Chicago civic pride, such as when the Blackhawks played in and won the 2010 Stanley Cup Finals and when the Cubs made their 2016 World Series run. Building engineers use a computer program to plot which windows need to be lighted to create the proper message.

Position in Chicago's skyline

References

External links

333 South Wabash Lighted Window Message Archive
Informative site

Office buildings completed in 1972
Skyscraper office buildings in Chicago
Insurance company headquarters in the United States
1972 establishments in Illinois